Epitola posthumus, the common giant epitola, is a butterfly in the family Lycaenidae. It is found in Guinea, Sierra Leone, Ivory Coast, Ghana, Togo, Nigeria (south and the Cross River loop), Cameroon, Gabon and the Republic of Congo. Its habitat consists of forests.

References

External links
Seitz, A. Die Gross-Schmetterlinge der Erde 13: Die Afrikanischen Tagfalter. Plate XIII 64

Poritiinae
Butterflies of Africa
Insects of Central Africa
Lepidoptera of West Africa
Butterflies described in 1793
Taxa named by Johan Christian Fabricius